Dato' Au How Cheong is a malaysian politician came from Gerakan.

He was elected as a Member of Parliament for three consecutive terms in the Teluk Intan area, which was originally known as Teluk Anson.  In the third term, he was appointed as a Parliamentary Secretary of Ministry of Energy, Telecom and Post.

In 1986, he contested as a Member of the Perak State Legislative Assembly. After winning the Sepetang seat, he was appointed as a Member of the Perak State Legislative Assembly, who was given the task of looking after the portfolio of Local Government, Consumer Affairs and Environment. He retired from politics in 1995.

Election Results

Honours
 :
 Officer of the Order of the Defender of the Realm (KMN) (1981)
 :
 Member of the Order of the Perak State Crown (AMP) (1979)
 Commander of the Order of the Perak State Crown (PMP) (1987)
 Knight Commander of the Order of the Perak State Crown (DPMP) - Dato' (1989)

References

People from Perak
Malaysian politicians of Chinese descent
Parti Gerakan Rakyat Malaysia politicians
Members of the Dewan Rakyat
Members of the Perak State Legislative Assembly
Officers of the Order of the Defender of the Realm
Year of birth missing